Ibrahim Muçaj ( December 8th 1944 – January 5th 2010) was an Albanian film director. He directed Apasionata in 1983 with Kristaq Mitro. He was born in Vlorë.

References

External links

Albanian film directors
1944 births
2010 deaths
People from Vlorë